The Jackson–Herget House is a historic house at 206 South 4th Street in Paragould, Arkansas.  It is a -story wood-frame structure, clad in aluminum siding.  It has asymmetrical massing typical of the Queen Anne period, with a variety of gables, projecting sections, porches, and a three-story tower topped with a steeply pitched hip roof and wrought iron railing.  It is one of the finest Queen Anne houses in Greene County, despite the aluminum siding, which was added in such a way to match the earlier clapboarding and without destroying some of the trim.  The house is further notable as the home of Richard Jackson, one of Paragould's leading businessmen and civic boosters.

The house was listed on the National Register of Historic Places in 1992. It is protected by The Arkansas Historic Preservation Program which identifies, evaluates, registers and preserves the State's Historic and Cultural Resources including the Jackson–Herget House.

See also
National Register of Historic Places listings in Greene County, Arkansas

References

Houses on the National Register of Historic Places in Arkansas
Queen Anne architecture in Arkansas
Houses completed in 1890
Houses in Greene County, Arkansas
National Register of Historic Places in Greene County, Arkansas
Buildings and structures in Paragould, Arkansas